Ibogaline  is an alkaloid found in Tabernanthe iboga along with the related chemical compounds ibogaine, ibogamine, and other minor alkaloids. It is a relatively smaller component of Tabernanthe iboga root bark total alkaloids (TA) content. It is also present in Tabernaemontana species such as Tabernaemontana australis which shares similar ibogan-biosynthetic pathways. The percentage of ibogaline in T. iboga root bark is up to 15% TA with ibogaine constituting 80% of the alkaloids and ibogamine up to 5%.

Chemistry

Derivatives
Kisantine and Gabonine are thought to be ibogaline's oxidation byproducts.

Adverse effect
In rodents, ibogaline induces more body tremor and ataxia compared to ibogaine and ibogamine.  Among a series of iboga and harmala alkaloids evaluated in rats, the study authors found the following order of potency in causing tremors:

 ED50 (μmol/kg, sc): tabernanthine (4.5) > ibogaline (7.6) > harmaline (12.8) > harmine (13.7) > ibogaine (34.8) > noribogaine (176.0)

A subsequent study confirmed these findings.

See also 
 Coronaridine
 Voacangine

References 

Alkaloids found in Iboga
Indole alkaloids